The phonological system of the modern Belarusian language consists of at least 44 phonemes: 5 vowels and 39 consonants. Consonants may also be geminated.  There is no absolute agreement on the number of phonemes; rarer or contextually variant sounds are included by some scholars.

Many consonants may form pairs that differ only in palatalization (called hard vs soft consonants, the latter being represented in the IPA with the symbol ). In some of such pairs, the place of articulation is additionally changed (see distinctive features below). There are also unpaired consonants that have no corollary in palatalization.

Distinctive features 
As an East Slavic language, Belarusian phonology is very similar to both Russian and Ukrainian phonology. The primary differences are:
 Akannye – the merger of unstressed  into . In standard Russian akanye, the merger happens only after hard consonants; after soft consonants,  merges with  instead. Ukrainian does not have this merger at all. In Belarusian, unlike Russian, this change is reflected in spelling: compare  "head", pronounced , with Russian   and Ukrainian  .
 Tsyekannye and dzyekannye – the pronunciation of Old East Slavic  as soft affricates . This occurs in  "ten", pronounced ; compare Russian  , Ukrainian  .Many Russian speakers similarly affricate phonemic , but this is not universal and not written.
 Postalveolar consonants are all hard (laminal retroflex), whereas Russian has both hard and soft postalveolars.
 Proto-Slavic  shifted to Belarusian and Russian  before a hard consonant. Compare the Belarusian word for "green", and the Russian word, with Ukrainian  .

Unlike in Russian but like in Ukrainian, Belarusian spelling closely represents surface phonology rather than the underlying morphophonology. The representation of akannye in particular introduces striking differences between Russian and Belarusian orthography.

Vowels

As with Russian,  is not a separate phoneme, but an allophone of  occurring after non-palatalized consonants.

Consonants
The consonants of Belarusian are as follows:

Other borrowed words have the fricative pronunciation:   ('geography').

The geminated variations are transcribed as follows:
  
  
  
  
  
  
  .

References

Bibliography

Further reading 

 

Phonology
Slavic phonologies